Eronilde Nunes de Araújo (born 31 December 1970 in Bom Jesus da Lapa, Bahia) is a Brazilian athlete who specialized in 400 metres hurdles. He dominated athletic events on the South American scene during the 1990s. His personal best of 48.04 seconds is also the South American record. He represented his country three times at the Olympics.

International competitions

See also
Olympic athletes of Brazil

References

External links

1970 births
Living people
Brazilian male hurdlers
Athletes (track and field) at the 1991 Pan American Games
Athletes (track and field) at the 1992 Summer Olympics
Athletes (track and field) at the 1996 Summer Olympics
Athletes (track and field) at the 2000 Summer Olympics
Athletes (track and field) at the 1995 Pan American Games
Athletes (track and field) at the 1999 Pan American Games
Athletes (track and field) at the 2003 Pan American Games
Olympic athletes of Brazil
Pan American Games medalists in athletics (track and field)
Pan American Games gold medalists for Brazil
Pan American Games silver medalists for Brazil
Medalists at the 1995 Pan American Games
Medalists at the 1999 Pan American Games
Sportspeople from Bahia
20th-century Brazilian people
21st-century Brazilian people